David Bodington (born 30 July 1947) is a British speed skater. He competed in two events at the 1968 Winter Olympics.

References

1947 births
Living people
British male speed skaters
Olympic speed skaters of Great Britain
Speed skaters at the 1968 Winter Olympics
Sportspeople from Birmingham, West Midlands